The Thirty Years' War was a series of wars in Europe lasting from 1618 to 1648.

Thirty Years' War or  Thirty Years War may also refer to:

Wars 
 The Mauritanian Thirty Years' War of 1644–74 (in Northwest Africa), also called Char Bouba war
 Second Thirty Years' War, a term sometimes used to encompass the wars in Europe from 1914 to 1945

Other uses 

 The Thirty Years War, 1938 history book by C. V. Wedgwood
  "The 30 Years War", former name of the band The Fall of Troy
 Thirty Years War (wargame), a 1976 board wargame